Hebbatam is a village in Alur Taluq, Kurnool district, Andhra Pradesh, India. The village constitutes around 2800 resident voters. Members of many castes are found in the village. It has one canal and three ponds, one of which was damaged by heavy rain in 2005.

Villages in Kurnool district